Nawab Liaquat Ali Khan is a Pakistani politician who had been a member of the National Assembly of Pakistan from 2008 to 2013.

Political career
He ran for the seat of the National Assembly of Pakistan from Constituency NA-152 (Multan-V) as a candidate of Pakistan Muslim League (Q) (PML-Q) but was unsuccessful. He received 36,335 votes and lost the seat to Assad Murtaza Gilani.

He was elected to the National Assembly from Constituency NA-152 (Multan-V) as a candidate of Pakistan Peoples Party (PPP) in 2008 Pakistani general election. He received 47,880 votes and defeated Syed Mujahid Ali Shah, a candidate of PML-Q.

References

Living people
Pakistani MNAs 2008–2013
Pakistan People's Party MNAs
Year of birth missing (living people)